Catapiesis is a genus of beetles in the family Carabidae, containing the following species:

 Catapiesis attenuata (Chaudoir, 1862)
 Catapiesis bartyrae Reichardt, 1970
 Catapiesis brasiliensis (Gray, 1832)
 Catapiesis columbica Chevrolat, 1838
 Catapiesis mexicana (Chaudoir, 1854)
 Catapiesis nitida Solier, 1835
 Catapiesis sulcipennis Bates, 1882
 Catapiesis tumida Reichardt, 1973

References

Pterostichinae